The 1957 Louisville Cardinals football team was an American football team that represented the University of Louisville as an independent during the 1957 NCAA College Division football season. In its 12th season under head coach Frank Camp, the team compiled a 9–1 record and defeated Drake in the Sun Bowl. The team played its home games at Fairgrounds Stadium in Louisville, Kentucky.

Leonard "Bones" Lyles led the nation in scoring.  He also set Louisville records for points in a season and in a career, yards gained in a season, and most rushing yards in a career.

Schedule

Players selected in the 1958 NFL Draft

References

Louisville
Louisville Cardinals football seasons
Sun Bowl champion seasons
Louisville Cardinals football